Wives Never Know is a 1936 American black-and-white comedy film directed by Elliott Nugent.  Written by Frederick Hazlitt Brennan, Edwin Justus Mayer and Keene Thompson, the film stars Charlie Ruggles, Mary Boland, and Adolphe Menjou, and was produced by Adolph Zukor for Paramount Pictures.

Plot
Homer (Charlie Ruggles) and Marcia Bigelow (Mary Boland) are a happily married couple.  Visiting novelist J. Hugh Ramsey (Adolphe Menjou) considers himself both too wise to ever marry and, through hubris, qualified to offer his own wild theories on what constitutes a happy marriage.  He had thus written a best selling novel titled Marriage, the Living Death. Ramsey decides that the Bigelow marriage could not possibly be as perfect as it appears, and convinces Homer that his wife must be secretly unhappy because she had never had the opportunity to forgive the morally spotless Homer for any misdeed. Wishing to please, Homer decides to involve himself in a trist so that Marcia would then have something for which she could forgive him. He chooses French actress Renée La Journée (Vivienne Osborne) who is performing nearby. Ramsey learns of the affair and discovers that the La Journée turns out to be the one love of his life that he had lost years earlier.

Cast

 Charlie Ruggles as Homer Bigelow  
 Mary Boland as Marcia Bigelow 
 Adolphe Menjou as J. Hugh Ramsey 
 Vivienne Osborne as Renée La Journée 
 Claude Gillingwater as Mr. Gossamer 
 Fay Holden as Mrs. Gossamer 
 Louise Beavers as Florabelle 
 Constance Bergen as Miss Giddings 
 Purnell Pratt as Higgins 
 Suzanne Kaaren as Miss Flinton 
 Irving Bacon as Dr. Mumford 
 Edward LeSaint as Mr. Banker 
 Henry Roquemore as Mr. Merchant
 Edward Earle as Mr. Lawyer
 Roger Gray as Farmer
 Arthur Housman as Snorter 

 Tom Kennedy as Bartender 
 Priscilla Lawson as Laboratory Assistant
 Jack Mulhall as Scout 
 Frank O'Connor as Police Sergeant
 Lee Shumway as Police Sergeant 
 Edward Gargan as Officer 
 Lee Phelps as Doorman 
 James Pierce as Dentist 
 Ernest Shields as Drunk
 William Irving as Drunk  
 Billy Bletcher as Drunk 
 Lillian West as Gossip 
 John M. Sullivan as Director 
 Ben Taggart as  
 Ellen Drew (uncredited)

Critical response
Lawrence Journal-World called the film "a delightful and hilarious comedy of married life". They wrote that Charles Ruggles and Mary Boland "carry the lead roles in inimitable manner which has endeared them to millions", and that the film marked a return to film for actress Vivienne Osborne after a two-year absence.  Evening Independent noted that a film combination of Charles Ruggles and Mary Boland is always irresistible, and wrote that the film "kept the preview audience laughing from beginning to the last fade-out". In consideration of the three stars, they wrote "Ruggles, Boland and Menjou make a rollicking comedy trio", and predicted that the film "should play a merry tune at boxoffices".  In October 1936, The Sunday Morning Star listed the film as one of its 'Best Bets of the Week'.

Conversely, Pittsburgh Post-Gazette advised that fans of Charles Ruggles and Mary Boland would be in for a "considerable let-down" when watching the film. In examining the film in comparison to previous films where Ruggles and Boland reprised roles where they were husband and wife, they wrote of Wives Never Know that "it is a listless, laborous little comedy that resembles the result of a scavenger hunt at the old Mack Sennett Studios."  They offered that there were the expected laughs to be found in any film involving Ruggles and Boland, but that the storyline itself possessed few comic qualities, and that left to their own resources, the co-stars "falter and fumble through six or seven reels of makeshift humor."

The New York Times made note of the ongoing screen partnering of Charles Ruggles and Mary Boland, and that the film in offering Ruggles' "familiar timid-husband sequences" and Boland's  "usual number of stock Bolandisms", seems to be holding "a sacrifice auction sale..." "...at a considerable reduction in humor."  In addressing the film plot, they felt it was "merely an antiquated type of stage farce enacted before a camera".  However, they made special note of the contribution of Adolphe Menjou, who in the role of a visiting author, was "quixotic as ever" in his character's "commendable effort to break up the Ruggles-Boland marriage."  They commended that the entire cast gave their best efforts, and that "even the urbane Mr. Menjou falls into the ditch, as it were, unreservedly, without holding back a shred of himself."

Release
Released theatrically in the United States September 13, 1936, the film was released as Jos rouvat tietäisivät in Finland May 23, 1937, and as Sikken en nat in Denmark August 9, 1937.  In 1958 the rights were purchased by MCA/Universal Pictures.

References

External links
 Wives Never Know at the Internet Movie Database

1936 films
1936 comedy films
American black-and-white films
Paramount Pictures films
Films directed by Elliott Nugent
American comedy films
1930s English-language films
1930s American films